Amirhossein Kermanshahi (born June 12, 1984) is an Iranian actor and photo model. 
he played in the black intelligence series made by Masoud Abparvar for first time in 2009.

Filmography
 2009 : Black Intelligence (Director : Masoud Abparvar)
 2009 : Mareke dar Mareke (Director : Alireza Haghshenas)
 2010 : Va ... Baraye Zamin (Director : Amirhossein Akbari)
 2010 : Nowruz (Director : Arad HassanZadeh)
 2010 : Ghezavat (Director : Mostafa Fatemi)
 2011 : 125 Mission (Director : Masoud Abparvar)

External links
 Facebook Page (Correct Web Page)
 Wikipedia Farsi
 Black Intelligence, PART 1 (JameJam Online)
 Black Intelligence, PART 2 (Fars News)
 Black Intelligence, PART 3 (Fars News)
 Black Intelligence, PART 4 (Sima Film)

21st-century Iranian male actors
Iranian male film actors
Male actors from Tehran
1984 births
Living people
Islamic Azad University alumni